Americanese is a 2006 American romantic drama film directed by Eric Byler and starring Chris Tashima, Allison Sie, Kelly Hu, Ben Shenkman, Autumn Reeser, and Joan Chen. It is based on the novel American Knees by Shawn Wong, concerning the relationships of a man and woman of East Asian descent in the United States.

Background 
The film was written and directed by Eric Byler, adapted from the novel, "American Knees," by Shawn Wong. It was produced by Lisa Onodera, who optioned the book when it was first published in 1995. The film had its world premiere at the South by Southwest Film Festival (SXSW) in 2006, where it won the Audience Award for Best Narrative Feature and a Special Jury Prize for Outstanding Ensemble Cast.  In October 2006, IFC Films acquired the film for distribution, under their IFC First Take distribution arm, which will release the film on a "day-and-date" platform, which will include a limited theatrical release accompanied simultaneously with a video on demand (V.O.D.) broadcast premiere on Comcast cable.

Premise
Raymond Ding, a middle-aged Chinese American college professor, and Aurora Crane, his younger Hapa (half East Asian) girlfriend, have just split, but continue to drift in and out of each other's lives. Unable to fully let go, Raymond visits the apartment they once shared, during the day while Aurora is away. Aurora is haunted by flash-backs of moments from their relationship.

Encouraged by their best friends to move on, Raymond and Aurora each begin new relationships. Aurora dates Steve, a white man closer to her age (and also her best friend's former boyfriend). Raymond dates Betty, a Vietnamese American colleague, who he soon discovers is haunted by her own past. Race and identity issues begin to surface as Raymond and Aurora try to start new lives, but remain drawn to their past.

Cast
 Chris Tashima as Raymond Ding
 Allison Sie as Aurora Crane
 Joan Chen as Betty Nguyen
 Kelly Hu as Brenda Nishitani
 Ben Shenkman as Steve
 Sab Shimono as Wood Ding
 Michael Paul Chan as Jimmy Chan 
 Autumn Reeser as Sylvia
 Ryan Cutrona as Hank Crane
 Takayo Fischer as Keiko Crane
 Annie Katsura Rollins as Julia Crane
 Greg Watanabe as Young Wood
 Stephen Bishop as Miles
 Munda Razooki as Test Driver #1
 Nathaniel H. Taylor as Test Driver #2
 Tyler Hori as Little Raymond
 Michael Potter as University Administrator
 Carol Saraceno as Woman with Dog
 Yuri Treschuck as Amerasian Youth at Bus Stop
 Jen Brown as Rumana
 Kayvon Esmaili as Brenda's Boyfriend at Party
 Teddy Chen Culver as Rumana's Boyfriend
 Pearl Wong as Helen Ding

Film festivals

2006
 South by Southwest Film Festival, in competition – Austin, TX
 24th San Francisco International Asian American Film Festival, Opening Night film – San Francisco, CA
 11th Chicago Asian American Showcase, Opening Night film – Chicago, IL
 22nd VC FilmFest, Closing Night film – Los Angeles, CA
 9th Aurora Asian Film Festival, Opening Night film – Aurora, CO
 32nd Seattle International Film Festival – Seattle, WA
 7th DC Asian Pacific American Film Festival, Opening Night film – Washington, DC
 14th Hamptons International Film Festival, in competition – East Hampton, NY
 26th Hawaii International Film Festival – Honolulu, HI
 29th Denver Film Festival – Denver, CO

2007
 9th Wisconsin Film Festival, Diaspora Melancholy: Asian American Films, co-presented by the Asian American Studies Program, University of Wisconsin–Madison – Madison, WI

Critical reception
Americanese was met with generally positive reviews. The film has a score of 67% with a certified "Fresh" rating on Rotten Tomatoes based on 9 reviews.

Acclaimed film critic Roger Ebert from the Chicago Sun-Times awarded the film 3 1/2 out of 4 stars and wrote of the film, saying "Byler deals with characters who have lived their years, learned from them, and try to apply their values to their lives. Their romances are not heedless but wary, and involve a lot of negotiation," and finished by calling the film "...uncommonly absorbing."

Kevin Crust of the Los Angeles Times in his review stated that Americanese had "fine, understated performances and the self-assured way that Byler lets the film find its own rhythms, rather than setting into some template, result in a mature film of subtle complexity".

Awards
 Audience Award – Best Narrative Feature – SXSW
 Special Jury Prize – Outstanding Ensemble Cast – SXSW
 Golden Space Needle Audience Award – Best Actor, 2nd Runner-Up (Chris Tashima) – Seattle International Film Festival

References

External links
 
 
 Roger Ebert review at Chicago Sun-Times
 in-depth critique by Stewart David Ikeda on IMDiversity.com
 Shawn Wong and Eric Byler discuss "Americanese" on IMDiversity.com

2006 films
2006 independent films
2006 romantic drama films
American independent films
American romantic drama films
Asian-American drama films
Films about Chinese Americans
2000s English-language films
Films scored by Michael Brook
Films about interracial romance
Films about race and ethnicity
Films based on American novels
Films set in the United States
2000s American films